Michael McNamara (born 1 March 1974) is an Irish Independent politician who has been a Teachta Dála (TD) for the Clare constituency since the 2020 general election, and previously from 2011 to 2016. He was appointed Chair of the Special Committee on the COVID-19 Response in September 2020.

He was a member of the Oireachtas Committee on Agriculture, Food and the Marine, and a member of the Parliamentary Assembly of the Council of Europe from 2011 to 2016.

McNamara is a barrister and has worked at the OSCE and on human rights and democracy projects of the European Union and United Nations. He was an unsuccessful Independent candidate at the 2009 European Parliament election for the North-West constituency.

In May 2015, he was expelled from the parliamentary Labour Party for voting against the government in the sale of Aer Lingus shares, the third time he voted against the government. He rejoined the parliamentary Labour Party in September 2015.

He lost his seat at the 2016 general election. He was elected as an independent candidate for the Clare constituency at the 2020 general election.

References

External links
Michael McNamara's page on the Labour Party website

 

1974 births
Living people
Alumni of University College Cork
Independent TDs
Irish barristers
Labour Party (Ireland) TDs
Members of the 31st Dáil
Members of the 33rd Dáil
Politicians from County Clare